First Line, First line, First-line or Firstline can refer to:

Firstline, New Zealand TV news programme
First Line (comics) (Marvel Comics)
First line (ice hockey)
First Line (album), a 1988 album by tubist Bob Stewart
First-line treatment, in medical treatment
Primeira Linha (First Line in galician Portuguese), galician communist and independentist party
 Incipit (Latin for "it begins"), the first line of a poem
FirstLine Transportation Security, Inc., US company
Firstline Schools, school operator in New Orleans, US
The First Line (album), by Marcellus Hall, 2011
The First Line (magazine), an American literary periodical
Primera Línea, a Chilean protest group

See also
Line 1 (disambiguation)